David Clennon (born May 10, 1943) is an American actor. He is known for his portrayal of Miles Drentell in the ABC series thirtysomething and Once and Again, as well as his role as Palmer in the John Carpenter film The Thing.  He has been frequently cast in films directed by Hal Ashby, Costa-Gavras and Jordan Walker-Pearlman.

Life and career
Born in Waukegan, Illinois, the son of Virginia, a homemaker, and Cecil Clennon, an accountant, Clennon attended the University of Notre Dame from 1962 to 1965. He studied at the Yale School of Drama for three years and became a member of their professional acting company. In 1996 he married Perry Adleman, a writer, camera assistant and photographer. They have two children. 

In 1980, Clennon provided the voice for Admiral Motti in NPR's Star Wars The Original Radio Drama. He was a regular on the TV shows Barney Miller, Almost Perfect, The Agency, and Saved. Clennon also played Carl Sessick (a.k.a. Carl the Watcher) on Ghost Whisperer and appeared on Star Trek: Voyager as Dr. Crell Moset. In 1993 he won an Emmy award for his guest appearance on the series Dream On.

Clennon often performs at New Haven, Connecticut's Long Wharf Theatre.

Political activism
Clennon staunchly opposed the Vietnam War, often participating in protests, and remains politically active. In 2013, he repeatedly spoke out against the film Zero Dark Thirty and refused to vote for it for an Academy Award, stating that it promoted using torture as acceptable.

In 2018, he opposed the four Emmy nominations for Ken Burns's documentary program The Vietnam War'", feeling that it contained "half-truths, distortions and omissions" about the war.

Filmography

 The Paper Chase (1973) - Toombs
 Helter Skelter (1976, TV Movie) - Harry Jones
 Bound for Glory (1976) - Carl - Man in Gas Station
 The Greatest (1977)
 Coming Home (1978) - Tim
 Gray Lady Down (1978) - Crew member of USS Neptune
 Go Tell the Spartans (1978) - Lt. Finley Wattsberg
 On the Yard (1978) - Psychiatrist
 Billy in the Lowlands (1979) - Social Worker
 Being There (1979) - Thomas Franklin
 Hide in Plain Sight (1980) - Richard Fieldston
 WKRP in Cincinnati (1981, TV Series) - Norris Breeze
 The Thing (1982) - Palmer
 The Escape Artist (1982) - Newspaper Editor
 Missing (1982) - Consul Phil Putnam
 Ladies and Gentlemen, The Fabulous Stains (1982) - Dave Robell - The Agent
 Special Bulletin (1983, TV Movie) - Dr. Bruce Lyman
 Star 80 (1983) - Geb
 Hanna K. (1983) - Amnon
 The Right Stuff (1983) - Liaison Man
 Falling in Love (1984) - Brian Gilmore
 Sweet Dreams (1985) - Randy Hughes
 Legal Eagles (1986) - Blanchard
 The Trouble with Dick (1986) - Lars
 He's My Girl (1987) - Mason Morgan
 The Couch Trip (1988) - Lawrence Baird
 Betrayed (1988) - Jack Carpenter
 Downtown (1990) - Jerome Sweet
 Light Sleeper (1992) - Robert
 Man Trouble (1992) - Lewie Duart
 Matinee (1993) - Jack
 And the Band Played On (1993, TV Movie) - Mr. Johnstone
 Dos crímenes (1994) - Jim
 Almost Perfect (TV series) - (1995-1997) - Neal Luder
 Grace of My Heart (1996) - Dr. 'Jonesy' Jones
 From the Earth to the Moon (1998, TV Mini-Series) - Dr. Leon (Lee) Silver
 Playing by Heart (1998) - Martin (uncredited)
 Nothing Human (Star Trek: Voyager) (1998) - Crell Moset
 Just Shoot Me! (1999, TV Series) - Martin Spancer
 The Visit (2000) - Parole Board Member Brenner
 Antitrust (2001) -  Barry Linder (uncredited)
 Silver City (2004) - Mort Seymour
 Constellation (2005) - Bear Korngold
 Syriana (2005) - Donald
 Life of the Party (2005) - Jack
 Grey’s Anatomy (American TV series, 2005) - season 5 episode 4
 Flags of Our Fathers (2006) - White House Official
 Saving Sarah Cain (2007) - Homeless Man
 Convention (2008) - Sen. Chuck McGee
 Extraordinary Measures (2010) - Dr. Renzler
 The Good Doctor (2011) - Dr. Harbison
 Ghost Phone: Phone Calls from the Dead (2011) - Hamilton
 J. Edgar (2011) - Senator Friendly
 Mr. Jones (2013) - The Curator
 House of Cards (2014, TV Series) - Ted Havemeyer
 Gone Girl (2014) - Rand Elliott
 Amigo Undead (2015) - Old Man Schumer
 Vacation (2015) - Harry Co-Pilot
 Reversion (2015) - Ciespy
 Welcome to the Men's Group'' (2016) - Fred

References

External links

1943 births
American male film actors
American male television actors
Male actors from Illinois
Primetime Emmy Award winners
Living people
Actors from Waukegan, Illinois
Yale School of Drama alumni
20th-century American male actors
21st-century American male actors